Ottilie Metzger-Lattermann also formerly Ottilie Metzger-Froitzheim (15 July 1878 – February 1943) was a German contralto who was a famous performer of works by Wagner during the 1910s, and who after her retirement was murdered in Auschwitz.

Career
Matzger was born in Frankfurt. Her first husband was the author Clemens Froitzheim. In Hamburg she met the bass-baritone Theodor Lattermann who became her second husband. From 1901 until 1912, she sang at Bayreuth Festival, where her Erda in Der Ring des Nibelungen was esteemed.

She was a student of Selma Nicklass-Kempner, Georg Vogel and Emanuel Reicher (acting). Her debut was 1898 in Halle, followed by engagements in Cologne, then from 1903 to 1915 first contralto with the Hamburg State Opera and played opposite Enrico Caruso. Then followed Dresden, Bayreuth Festival, Vienna State Opera, Saint Petersburg, Prague, Zurich Opera, Amsterdam, Munich, Budapest, Royal Opera House Covent Garden and tours with conductor Leo Blech in the USA. This ended in 1925 with the illness of Theodor who died on 4 March 1926 aged 46. From 1927 she taught singing at the Stern Conservatory in Berlin, where she herself had studied.

Metzger-Lattermann continued to perform as a Lieder recitalist, often accompanied by Richard Strauss and Hans Pfitzner. She gave her last concerts in 1933 under Bruno Walter in Berlin and Otto Klemperer in Dresden, with the seizure of power by Hitler.

After 1933, under the Nazi regime, Metzger-Lattermann continued to perform for Jewish audiences, on at least one occasion in a Lieder evening with the baritone Erhard Wechselmann, who was also to perish in Auschwitz.

In 1933, the American theatre impresario George Blumental (a former associate of Oscar Hammerstein I, who in 1917 had tried to set up theatres for American troops in Paris), tried to arrange with Georg Hartmann and Arthur Hirsch to bring over conductor Blech and a troupe of 12 Jewish opera singers to present Wagner's Ring in New York. Hirsch's assistant, Otto Metzger, was Ottilie's brother and Ottilie was on the list. Blumental's plans came to nothing, partly due to the unavailability of Blech, Klemperer, and Walter.

Metzger-Lattermann and her daughter fled to Brussels in 1939, but there were later rounded up by the Nazis and sent to the camps. She died in Auschwitz. The exact circumstances of the deaths of herself and her daughter are unknown.

Bayreuth memorial
During the 1970s, a Bayreuth antiquarian bookseller, Peer Baedeker petitioned Winifred Wagner for a plaque to "Richard Breitenfeld, Henriette Gottlieb, Ottilie Metzger-Lattermann – Honoured as festival singers – Murdered in Nazi concentration camps" to be installed at Bayreuth.

Recordings
 Richard Wagner, Siegfried, "Stark ruft das Lied" (1908), Opera Nederland, profile, photo

References

External links
Career, photos

German people who died in Auschwitz concentration camp
Musicians from Frankfurt
1943 deaths
1878 births
Operatic contraltos
German operatic contraltos
Jewish opera singers
20th-century German women opera singers
German Jews who died in the Holocaust